Heidi Kumao (born 1964) is a video and machine artist, and professor at the University of Michigan. She has received a Guggenheim Fellowship and a Creative Capital Emerging Fields Award.

Work
In her work, Kumao projects video, often stop-motion animation, onto various surfaces, including machines. Her 1994 work, Feed, projected animations from zoetrope machines onto surfaces such as "a player-piano scroll, a paper screen, blank photograph frames, and the interior of a cardboard box."

In 2005, Kumao created a series of machines suggesting women's legs for the piece Misbehaving: Media Machines Act Out. The legs were named "Protest," "Resist," and "Translator." With videos embedded into the legs' torsos, the machines acted out "tableaus of protest" such as stomping on the floor, writhing on the ground or dance.

Kumao broke her back in 2011. Her work has since incorporated aspects of the body. Other works explore human constraint, such as human trafficking and Japanese-American internment camps.

Awards
 2002: Creative Capital Emerging Fields Award 
 2009: Guggenheim Fellowship
 2008: Governor's Award for Michigan Innovative Artist 
 2007: Postdoctoral Research Fellowship from the American Association of University Women Educational Foundation
 2006: Malvina Hoffmann Award for Finest Sculpture from the National Academy

References

External links
 Interview with Heidi Kumao

1964 births
Living people
American women video artists
American video artists
Artists from Michigan
University of Michigan faculty
20th-century American artists
21st-century American artists
20th-century American women artists
University of California, Davis alumni
21st-century American women artists
American women academics